The 1997 National Hockey League All-Star Game took place on January 18, 1997, at San Jose Arena in San Jose, home of the San Jose Sharks. The final score was Eastern Conference 11, Western Conference 7.  This game was originally scheduled for the 1994–95 season, but was cancelled due to the 1994–95 NHL lockout.

Super Skills Competition
The Eastern Conference won the skills competition for the first time since 1992. St. Louis Blues' Al MacInnis won the Hardest Shot event for the third time in his career by slapping the puck at 98.9 mph. Boston Bruins' defenceman Ray Bourque won the Shooting Accuracy event for the fourth time, hitting four targets in seven shots. Florida Panthers' goaltender John Vanbiesbrouck stopped all 10 shots by Mats Sundin and Derian Hatcher in Rapid-Fire Relay to outduel Colorado Avalanche netminder Patrick Roy who made nine saves.  In the Power-Play Relay, Vanbiesbrouck allowed only two of six shots to elude him that were taken by Mighty Ducks of Anaheims' Teemu Selanne and Paul Kariya to claim the Goaltenders Competition.

Individual Event winners
 Puck Control Relay - Geoff Sanderson (Hartford Whalers)
 Fastest Skater - Peter Bondra, (Washington Capitals) - 13.610 seconds
 Accuracy Shooting - Ray Bourque, (Boston Bruins) - 4 hits, 7 shots
 Hardest Shot - Al MacInnis, (St. Louis Blues) - 98.9 mph
 Goaltenders Competition - John Vanbiesbrouck, (Florida Panthers) - 2 GA, 16 shots

The Game
Montreal Canadiens' right-winger Mark Recchi had a hat-trick to lead the Eastern Conference to an 11–7 victory and to be named All-Star M.V.P.  Mark Recchi would become the fourth Montreal Canadien to receive the award.  A record 10 goals was scored in the second period, including two from hometown favorite San Jose Sharks' right-winger Owen Nolan in a record eight seconds.  Nolan would complete his hat-trick in the third period as he closed in on a breakaway towards Buffalo Sabres' goaltender Dominik Hasek. Nolan pointed to the top left corner and then fired a shot right off the bar top corner. Gary Thorne called it saying, "here come the chapeaus!". The crowd erupted, throwing hats everywhere.

Boxscore

 Referee: Rob Shick
 Linesmen: Ron Asselstine, Bob Hodges, Leon Stickle
 Television: FOX, CBC, SRC

See also
1996–97 NHL season

Notes

Jaromir Jagr was voted as a starter, but was not able to play due to injury. Adam Oates was named as his replacement and John LeClair was his replacement in the starting lineup.
Joe Sakic was voted as a starter, but was not able to play due to injury. Teemu Selanne was named as his replacement and Tony Granato who was already selected by the Commissioner was his replacement in the starting lineup.
Peter Forsberg was selected, but was not able to play due to injury.  Brendan Shanahan was named as his replacement.
Zigmund Palffy was selected, but was not able to play due to injury. Scott Lachance was named as his replacement.
Chris Osgood was selected, but was not able to play due to injury.  Guy Hebert was named as his replacement.
Mike Modano was selected, but was not able to play due to injury.  Keith Tkachuk was named as his replacement.
Rob Blake was selected, but was not able to play due to injury.  Dmitri Khristich was named as his replacement.

References
 

All-Star Game
National Hockey League All-Star Games
Sports competitions in San Jose, California
National Hockey League All-Star Game
20th century in San Jose, California
January 1997 sports events in the United States